Lapthal is located in the Pithoragarh district and Chamoli district of Uttarakahand, India. Current Lapthal is controlled by India but claimed by Zanda County, Ngari Prefecture, Tibet, China.

ITBP border out posts 
Lapthal and Rimkhim border out posts of the Indo-Tibetan Border Police are located in the area. It took the Border Roads Organisation 24 years to connect Rimkhim to the nearest habitat of Malari, 41 kilometers away.

References 

Uttarakhand